Immetalia saturata is a species of moth of the family Noctuidae. It is found in New Guinea and Papua New Guinea.

This species is very variable in coloration.

References

Agaristinae
Lepidoptera of Papua New Guinea
Lepidoptera of New Guinea
Moths described in 1865